Rich Slave is the fifth solo studio album by American rapper Young Dolph and his last studio album to be released during his lifetime. It was released on August 14, 2020, through his label Paper Route Empire. The production on the album was primarily handled by Bandplay with additional production by Juicy J, Supah Mario, Cassius Jay and others. The album features guest appearances from G Herbo, Key Glock and Megan Thee Stallion. Dolph explained the album's title, stating "It's the reality of being Black in this country".

Rich Slave was preceded by four singles: "RNB" featuring Megan Thee Stallion, "Blue Diamonds", "Death Row" and "Large Amounts". The album received generally positive reviews from music critics and was a commercial success. It debuted at number four on the US Billboard 200, earning 65,000 album-equivalent units in its first week, marking Dolph's highest-charting project. It also charted at number 84 on the Canadian Albums Chart.

Promotion
On August 2, 2020, Young Dolph announced that he would be releasing his fifth studio album, Rich Slave on August 14, 2020. He also made the album available for pre-order on all platforms including his website. Dolph also announced that he would be giving away his blue and tangerine coloured Lamborghini Aventador to a lucky fan who pre-ordered the album. He stated, "Last week I walked in the garage to get on my 4wheeler and I looked at my Lambo and said to myself 'Dolph u should give someone your aventador and let them enjoy it, u not doin nothin wit it'. The car's retail price was approximately valued at $417,826.

Critical reception

Tom Breihan of Stereogum praised Young Dolph, labelling him as a "cult hero". Breihan also spoke on the album's political aspects and Dolph's use of the term "slave", saying "anytime a Black artist uses 'slave' in a title, a whole lot of history goes into it." Breihan described the album as incidentally political but not overstated, saying that "Dolph hints at that history all through the album." Breihan also praised the production, saying that "the beats on Rich Slave are big and warm and solid." Ultimately, Breihan said it "works because it's a strong rapper talking strong shit over strong beats." He also regarded it as "one of the most purely enjoyable rap records I've heard this year."

Commercial performance
Rich Slave debuted at number four on the US Billboard 200 chart, earning 65,000 album-equivalent units (including 32,000 copies in pure album sales) in its first week. This became Young Dolph's second US top-ten debut on the chart and his highest first-week sales to date. Physical sales for the album were boosted by offering merchandise/album bundles via his website. The album also accumulated a total of 44.31 million on-demand streams of the set's songs.

Track listing

Charts

Weekly charts

Year-end charts

Certifications

References

External links

2020 albums
Young Dolph albums
Albums produced by Juicy J
Empire Distribution albums
Albums produced by Drumma Boy